Faviola Spitale is a pageant titleholder, was born in Valencia, Venezuela in 1975. She is the Miss Venezuela International titleholder for 1993, and was the official representative of Venezuela to the Miss International 1993 pageant held in Tokyo, Japan, on October 9, 1993, when she classified in the Top 15 semifinalists.

Spitale competed in the national beauty pageant Miss Venezuela 1993 and obtained the title of Miss Venezuela International. She represented the Yaracuy state.

References

External links
Miss Venezuela Official Website
Miss International Official Website

1975 births
Living people
People from Valencia, Venezuela
Miss Venezuela International winners
Miss International 1993 delegates